The Theodor Wolff Prize is a German journalism prize. In addition, at irregular intervals, journalists are awarded the Theodor Wolff Prize for their life's work.

The award is dedicated to the memory of Theodor Wolff, who was forced into exile by the Nazis from Germany in February 1933 because of his Jewish origin and on account of ferocious opposition to the Nazi Party seizure of power the previous month. Until 1933, he was the liberal democratic chief editor of the Berliner Tageblatt.

Jury 
The jury in 2016 consisted of nine people:
 Nikolaus Blome (Bild)
  (Die Welt)
  (Frankfurter Allgemeine Sonntagszeitung)
  (Saarbrücker Zeitung)
 Christian Lindner (Rhein-Zeitung)
  (Der Tagesspiegel)
  (Aachener Zeitung)
  (Süddeutsche Zeitung)
  (Kölnische Rundschau)

Notable recipients 
1962:
 Thaddäus Troll (Bremer Nachrichten)

1964:
 Klaus Bresser (Kölner Stadt-Anzeiger)
 Karl-Hermann Flach (Frankfurter Rundschau)
 Kai Hermann (Die Zeit)

1966:
 Thomas von Randow (Die Zeit)
 Theo Sommer (Die Zeit)

1969:
 Günther von Lojewski (Frankfurter Allgemeine Zeitung)

1970:
 Gitta Bauer (Springer Auslandsdienst)

1971/72:
 Reinhard Appel (Süddeutsche Zeitung)

1972/73:
 Joachim Fest (Der Spiegel)

1973/74:
 Raimund Hoghe
 Hellmuth Karasek (Kölner Stadt-Anzeiger)

1983:
 Josef Joffe (Die Zeit)

1985:
 Thomas Kielinger (Die Welt)

1986:
 Rudolph Chimelli (Süddeutsche Zeitung)
 Cordt Schnibben (Die Zeit)

1994:
 Giovanni di Lorenzo (Süddeutsche Zeitung)

1999:
 Maxim Biller (Frankfurter Allgemeine Zeitung)

2001:
 Heribert Prantl (Süddeutsche Zeitung)
2002:

 Irena Brežná

2007:
 Nikolaus Blome (Die Welt)

2008:
 Carolin Emcke (Zeitmagazin)

2009:
 Bastian Obermayer (Frankfurter Allgemeine Zeitung)

2012:
 Harald Martenstein (Die Zeit)

2013:
 Robin Alexander
 Alfred Grosser

2014:
 Rudolph Chimelli

2017:
Deniz Yücel

References

External links
 

German journalism awards